Gürpınar may refer to:

Places
Gürpınar (District), Van
Gürpınar, Alaplı
Gürpınar, Bartın
Gürpınar, Çivril
Gürpınar, Göynük
Gürpınar, Kozluk
Gürpınar, Şabanözü
Gürpınar, Silvan
Agia Marina (Skylloura), village in Cyprus, Gürpınar in Turkish

People
Ates Gürpinar (born 1984), German politician
Burak Gürpınar (born 1975), Turkish drummer
Doğan Gürpınar, Turkish historian
Hüseyin Rahmi Gürpınar (1864–1944), Turkish writer
İrfan Gürpınar (1943–2020), Turkish politician

See also